SQO may refer to:
 Sorkhei language
 Standard Query Operator
 StarQuest Online
 Storuman Airport, serving Storuman, Sweden